John Leo Falconbridge Cook (December 4, 1892 – September 3, 1964) was a Canadian professional ice hockey player. He played with the Spokane Canaries and Vancouver Millionaires of the Pacific Coast Hockey Association, as well as the Regina Capitals and Edmonton Eskimos of the Western Canada Hockey League. He died in 1964.

Leo Cook played with his brother Lloyd Cook on the 1916–17 Spokane Canaries and 1917–18 Vancouver Millionaires teams.

References

External links
Leo Cook at JustSportsStats

1892 births
1964 deaths
Canadian ice hockey centres
Edmonton Eskimos (ice hockey) players
Ice hockey people from Ontario
Regina Capitals players
Saskatoon Sheiks players
Spokane Canaries players
Sportspeople from Norfolk County, Ontario
Vancouver Millionaires players
Victoria Aristocrats players